Manaria is a genus of sea snails, marine gastropod mollusks in the family Eosiphonidae, the true whelks and their allies.

Species
Species within the genus Manaria include:
 Manaria astrolabis Fraussen & Stahlschmidt, 2016
 Manaria atlantica (Fraussen & Hadorn, 2005)
 Manaria borbonica Fraussen & Stahlschmidt, 2016
 Manaria brevicaudata (Schepman, 1911)
 Manaria burkeae Garcia, 2008
 Manaria chinoi Fraussen, 2005
 Manaria circumsonaxa Fraussen & Stahlschmidt, 2016
 Manaria clandestina Bouchet & Waren, 1986
 Manaria corindoni Fraussen & Stahlschmidt, 2016
 Manaria corporosis Fraussen & Stahlschmidt, 2016
 Manaria excalibur Fraussen & Stahlschmidt, 2016
 Manaria explicibilis Fraussen & Stahlschmidt, 2016
 Manaria fluentisona Fraussen & Stahlschmidt, 2016
 Manaria formosa Bouchet & Waren, 1986
 Manaria fusiformis (Clench & Aguayo, 1941)
 Manaria hadorni Fraussen & Stahlschmidt, 2016
 Manaria indomaris Fraussen & Stahlschmidt, 2016
 Manaria jonkeri (Koperberg, 1931)
 † Manaria koperbergae Fraussen & Stahlschmidt, 2016 
 Manaria kuroharai Azuma, 1960
 Manaria lirata Azuma, 1960
 Manaria loculosa Fraussen & Stahlschmidt, 2016
 Manaria lozoueti Fraussen & Stahlschmidt, 2016
 Manaria makassarensis Bouchet & Waren, 1986
 Manaria terryni Fraussen & Stahlschmidt, 2016
 Manaria thorybopus (Bouchet & Warén, 1986)
 Manaria thurstoni Smith, 1906
 Manaria tongaensis Fraussen & Stahlschmidt, 2016
 Manaria tyrotarichoides Fraussen & Stahlschmidt, 2016
 † Manaria venemai (Koperberg, 1931) 
 synonyms
 Manaria callophorella Fraussen, 2004: synonym of Phaenomenella callophorella (Fraussen, 2004) (original combination)
 Manaria canetae (Clench & Aguayo, 1944): synonym of Gaillea canetae (Clench & Aguayo, 1944)
 Manaria galatheae (Powell, 1958): synonym of Aeneator galatheae Powell, 1958
 Manaria inflata Shikama, 1971: synonym of Phaenomenella inflata (Shikama, 1971) (original combination)
 Manaria insularis Okutani, 1986: synonym of Chryseofusus chrysodomoides (Schepman, 1911)

References

Eosiphonidae